The women's finweight (−47 kilograms) event at the 2002 Asian Games took place on Thursday 10 October 2002 at Gudeok Gymnasium, Busan, South Korea.

A total of 13 women from 13 different countries competed in this event, limited to fighters whose body weight was less than 47 kilograms. Chen Shih-hsin of Chinese Taipei won the gold medal after beating Nguyễn Thị Huyền Diệu of Vietnam in gold medal match 4–1.

Schedule
All times are Korea Standard Time (UTC+09:00)

Results 
Legend
DQ — Won by disqualification
R — Won by referee stop contest

References
2002 Asian Games Official Report, Page 726

External links
Official website

Taekwondo at the 2002 Asian Games